The 2008 RTL GP Masters of Formula 3 was the eighteenth Masters of Formula 3 race held at Zolder on 10 August 2008. It was won by Jules Bianchi, for ART Grand Prix.

Drivers and teams

Classification

Qualifying 1
Group A drivers are highlighted in green.

Odd numbers

Even numbers

Qualifying 2

Group A

Group B

Starting grid

Race

See also
 2008 Formula 3 Euro Series season
 2008 British Formula 3 season

References

Masters of Formula Three
Masters of Formula Three
Masters
Masters of Formula Three